On October 6, 1975, an assassination attempt in Rome, Italy, was carried out against Bernardo Leighton, a former Chilean Christian Democratic vice-president, then in exile. The assassination attempt seriously injured Bernardo Leighton, and his wife, Anita Fresno, leaving her permanently disabled.

Leighton was one of the founding members of the Chilean Christian Democrat Party. In 1966, he entered the government of Eduardo Frei Montalva, becoming a vice-president. Leighton left Chile in December 1973, after the coup d'état. In exile, he opposed the new regime of Pinochet, he had already been nominally open to Salvador Allende. In 1974, a year before the Leighton assassination attempt, General Prats, another Chilean exile, was murdered in the capital of Argentina, Buenos Aires.

Chilean General Manuel Contreras, head of DINA, has been indicted in Italy in 1995 for ordering the Leighton murder. Part of the indictment was based on testimony from Michael Townley. However, the Italian government was unable to get Contreras extradited from Chile, where he had already been incarcerated for ordering the assassination on Orlando Letelier. The deputy director of DINA, Raúl Iturriaga, was also sentenced.

See also
Operation Condor
Letelier case

References

1975 in Chile
1975 crimes in Italy
Failed assassination attempts in Europe
Failed terrorist attempts in Italy
1970s in Rome
Crime in Rome
October 1975 events in Europe
Terrorist incidents in Italy in 1975